Matthew M. Williams is an American designer, creative, and entrepreneur. The co-founder of the fashion brand 1017 ALYX 9SM, he was appointed creative director of Givenchy women's and men's collections in June 2020.

Early life 
Williams was born on October 17, 1985, in Evanston, Illinois. His parents worked in the medical field. When he was two years old, the family moved to Pismo Beach, California, where he grew up. As a child, he wanted to become an emergency room doctor. As a teen, he became interested in skateboard culture soccer and music, and would drive to Santa Barbara and Los Angeles to attend concerts and DJ sets. At 18, during an internship with a soccer coach who also owned a clothing brand, Williams realized that fashion could be a career. Williams took one semester of art classes at the University of California but never pursued any formal fashion training.

Career

Art direction 
Despite being rejected from Parsons School of Design, Williams landed a job as a production manager and began to learn the business of running a clothing label before discovering costume design through music stylists.

In 2007, Kanye West’s stylist asked Williams to design a jacket for his Grammy Awards performance with Daft Punk. Williams helped design a jacket with embedded LEDs. Impressed by the 21-year-old designer’s creativity, West asked Williams to join his team. Williams eventually moved from costume design for West to art directing videos and setting up the studio for West’s first fashion brand, Pastelle, as well as his creative content company, DONDA.

In 2012, ties with West led to the formation of the art and DJing collective Been Trill — made up of Heron Preston, Virgil Abloh, Justin Saunders and Williams, who describes it as "really just a fun thing to do."

A chance encounter with Lady Gaga in a sushi restaurant led to a steadfast friendship and an intense creative collaboration. Nicknamed “Dada” by Gaga's fans when he was the first artistic director of the “Haus of Gaga” (2008 to 2010), Williams went on to create much-noted costumes for the singer as she attained international stardom.

1017 Alyx 9SM 
Originally called ALYX, the brand was started by Matthew, Jennifer-his then wife, and Luca Benini in 2015. Jennifer Murray, Matthew’s ex-wife, managed global sales for the brand until stopping in 2019. For Fall-Winter 2015, they debuted Alyx a women's wear brand named after their eldest daughter, a project to express their views.  The label, which is rooted in contemporary culture, affirmative change, and longevity of design, quickly caught attention and was shortlisted for the 2016 LVMH Prize for Young Fashion Designers. Since then, the brand has restyled itself as 1017 Alyx 9SM (Matthew’s month and date of birth, October 17, the name of his oldest daughter, Alyx, and the neighborhood of New York where his first fashion studio was located, 9 St. Mark's Place) and won a loyal following for a highly focused collection with a very personal point of view, spanning women's wear, men's wear and accessories.

The designer's longstanding fascination with translating cultural undercurrents into high fashion informs the brand's aesthetic, and his signature “rollercoaster” buckle quickly became iconic among tastemakers.

1017 Alyx 9SM – Collaborations 
Through his label 1017 Alyx 9SM, Williams soon began collaborating with internationally recognized brands including Dior, Nike, Moncler, Bang & Olufsen, and Mackintosh.

Dior 
At Dior, Kim Jones, the artistic director for men's wear, invited Williams to collaborate on accessories for the Spring-Summer 2019 collection. Williams brought his brutalist industrial aesthetic to selected pieces through a utility buckle inspired by a rollercoaster ride at Six Flags amusement park. On the men's wear runway, the buckle cropped up on belts, caps and backpacks.

Nike 
In January 2020 Matthew Williams’ collection for Nike was released:

Moncler 
In February 2020, 1017 ALYX 9SM teamed up with Moncler for its Genius lines, combining his iconic tactical aesthetic with Moncler's boundary pushing outerwear.

Louisahhh 
In November 2021, 1017 ALYX 9SM teamed up with the Paris-based DJ, Louisahhh, to design a t-shirt to promote Louisahhh's new album, ‘The Practice of Freedom’.

XIN 
In March 2021, XIN announced a collaboration with 1017 ALYX 9SM.

Givenchy 
In June 2020, Williams was appointed Creative Director of Givenchy collections for women and men, launching his first collection in December 2020.

Personal life 
Williams was married to Jennifer Murray. They have two daughters - Alyx and Valetta. He has a son, Cairo, from a previous relationship with costume designer Erin Hirsh. He was also previously in a relationship with Lady Gaga.

References

American fashion designers
1985 births
Living people